The Doves is a Canadian drama film, directed by Jean-Claude Lord and released in 1972. The film stars Jean Besré as Julien Ferland, a wealthy young university professor who marries Josianne Boucher (Lise Thouin), an aspiring singer from a more working-class background, against the disapproval of their families.

The cast also includes Jean Duceppe, Manda Parent, Paul Berval, Jean Coutu and Diane Guérin, as well as singers Françoise Hardy and Willie Lamothe in small supporting roles.

The film was entered into competition at the 24th Canadian Film Awards.

References

External links

1972 films
Canadian drama films
1972 drama films
Films shot in Montreal
Films directed by Jean-Claude Lord
French-language Canadian films
1970s Canadian films